The Women's 10 m platform competition of the 2018 European Aquatics Championships was held on 8 August 2018.

Results
The preliminary round was started on at 09:30. The final was held at 14:40.

Green denotes finalists

References

Women's 10 m platform